Melrose Peak is a peak  south of Peters Peak in the Holyoake Range, Antarctica. It was mapped by the United States Geological Survey from tellurometer surveys and Navy air photos, 1960–62, and was named by the Advisory Committee on Antarctic Names for Robert L. Melrose, a United States Antarctic Research Program meteorologist at Hallett Station in 1963–64.

References

Mountains of the Ross Dependency
Shackleton Coast